The buddy system is a procedure in which two people operate together as a single unit so that they are able to monitor and help each other.

Buddy system may also refer to:

 Buddy memory system, a memory allocation algorithm
 The Buddy System (film), a 1984 American film
 "The Buddy System" (The Venture Bros.), a third season episode of The Venture Bros. 
 Rhett & Link's Buddy System, a 2016 web television series released on YouTube Red